Vered Yeriho is an Israeli settlement organized as a moshav in the West Bank. Located near Jericho in the Jordan Valley, it falls under the jurisdiction of Megilot Regional Council.

The international community considers Israeli settlements in the West Bank to be illegal under international law.

History
According to ARIJ, in 1978 Israel confiscated   618 dunams of land from the Palestinian site of Nabi Musa in order to construct Vered Yeriho.

The community was founded in 1979 as a result of the dissociation of the secular nucleus from the religious nucleus in Mitzpe Yeriho, a nearby settlement to the west of Vered Yeriho.  The moshav is located on a hill overlooking the Aqabat Jaber section of Jericho. From the scenic perimeter road of the moshav, one can see Jericho and the northern Dead Sea.

References

Moshavim
Israeli settlements in the West Bank
Populated places established in 1979
Agricultural Union
1979 establishments in the Israeli Military Governorate